Sixteen Mile Stand is a census-designated place (CDP) in Symmes Township, Hamilton County, Ohio, United States,  northeast of downtown Cincinnati. The population of Sixteen Mile Stand was 3,091 at the 2020 census.

History
Sixteen Mile Stand takes its name from the distance to Cincinnati via the Montgomery Pike.

Geography
The city of Montgomery is directly to the south.

Demographics

References

Census-designated places in Hamilton County, Ohio
Census-designated places in Ohio